The hundred of Colyton  was the name of one of thirty two ancient administrative units of Devon, England.

The parishes in the hundred were:
Branscombe;
Colyton;
Cotleigh;
Farway;
Monkton;
Northleigh;
Offwell;
Seaton and Beer;
Shute;
Southleigh and
Widworthy.

See also 
 List of hundreds of England and Wales - Devon

References 

Hundreds of Devon